Synodontis comoensis is a species of upside-down catfish endemic to Côte d'Ivoire.  This species grows to a length of  TL.

References

External links 

comoensis
Catfish of Africa
Freshwater fish of West Africa
Endemic fauna of Ivory Coast
Fish described in 1981
Taxa named by Jacques Daget